Ivory Coast competed at the 1972 Summer Olympics in Munich, West Germany.

Results by event

Athletics
Men's 100 metres
La Eilsten
 First Heat — DNS (→ did not advance)

Men's 4 × 100 m Relay
Kouakou Komenan, Amadou Meïté, Kouami N'Dri, and Gaoussou Koné 
 Heat — 39.81s (→ did not advance)

References

External links
 

Nations at the 1972 Summer Olympics
1972
1972 in Ivory Coast